The 2017 Campeonato Brasileiro Série A was the 61st season of the Campeonato Brasileiro Série A, the top level of professional football in Brazil, and the 14th edition in a double round-robin since its establishment in 2003. The season began on 13 May 2017 and ended on 3 December 2017. The top six teams qualified to Copa Libertadores and the last four were relegated to Série B of 2018.

Corinthians won their seventh title and was the first team in the history of the tournament, since the double round-robin system was established in 2003, to finish the first round undefeated.

Format
For the fifteenth consecutive season, the tournament was played in a double round-robin system. The team with most points at the end of the season was declared champion. The bottom four teams were relegated and will play the 2018 Série B.

International qualification
The Série A served as a qualifier to CONMEBOL's 2018 Copa Libertadores. The top four teams in the standings qualified to the group stage of the competition, while the fifth and the sixth placed in the standings qualified to the second stage.

And this change also impacted on Copa Sudamericana qualification, whose vacancies were again distributed through league placement instead of the Copa do Brasil.

Tiebreakers
In case of a tie on points between two or more clubs, tiebreakers were applied in the following order:

Number of wins;
Goal difference;
Goals pro;
Head to Head;
Fewest red cards;
Fewest yellow cards;
Draw.

With respect to the fourth criterion (direct confrontation), it is considered the result of the combined game, or the result of 180 minutes. Staying tie, the tie will be made by the greatest number of goals scored in the opponent's field. The fourth criterion is not considered in the case of a tie between more than two clubs.

Teams

Twenty teams competed in the league – the top sixteen teams from the previous season, as well as four teams promoted from the Série B.

Atlético Goianiense became the first club to be promoted after a 5–3 win against Tupi MG on 12 November 2016 meant they were guaranteed an automatic place. Avaí became the second club to be promoted, Vasco da Gama became the third club to be promoted, and Bahia became the fourth club to be promoted

{|
|- style="horizontal-align: top;"
|

</td>

|}

Number of teams by state

Stadiums and locations

Personnel and kits

Player transfers

Managerial changes

Foreign players
The clubs can have a maximum of five foreign players in their Campeonato Brasileiro squads per match.

1 Players holding Brazilian dual nationality.

Results

League table

Result table

Season statistics

Top scorers

Assists

Hat-tricks

Clean sheets

References

Campeonato Brasileiro Série A seasons
Campeonato Brasileiro Série A